All Your Life is an independent cassette from American Christian rock group Resurrection Band, released in late 1974. It features a collection of acoustic songs that the band would play for audiences that were unreceptive to its otherwise hard rock and heavy metal style.

Recording history 
Recorded alongside and released shortly after Music to Raise the Dead, All Your Life is an acoustic collection of folk-influenced music that Resurrection Band would play in more conservative venues, like nursing homes and churches, whose audiences would otherwise be unreceptive to the heavy metal that Resurrection Band otherwise played.

The cassette has never been re-released.

Track listing 
Track listing source:

Side A

 - "In the Beginning"
 - "Psalm 61"
 - "Because I Know Him"
 - "Trust In Jesus"
 - "Jesus Walked Upon the Water"

Side B
 - "Connections"
 - "Deep Inside My Heart"
 - "Blue Waters"
 - "All Your Life"

Personnel 
 Glenn Kaiser – lead vocals, guitars
 Wendi Kaiser – lead vocals
 Stu Heiss – lead guitar, piano
 Jim Denton – bass guitar, backing vocals
 John Herrin – drums
 Tom Cameron – harmonica

Production 
 Producer - Resurrection Band

References 

Resurrection Band albums
1973 albums
Demo albums